Den farlige alder is a 1911 Danish silent film directed by August Blom which was released internationally as The Price of Beauty. It was produced under the Nordisk Films banner.

The film is an adaptation of Karin Michaëlis' novel of the same name, which was published in english as The Dangerous Age: Letters and Fragments from a Woman's Diary. Like Michaëlis' novel, the film focused on themes of gender roles and sexuality. At the time it was released, Den farlige alder was considered controversial and was censored or banned in several locations.

Cast
Gerda Christophersen - Elsie von Lindtner
Clara Wieth, Lisa
Valdemar Psilander -Leopold von Würzen
Otto Lagoni - den gamle greve
Aage Hertel - Enrice Vallé, the Italian singer
Frederik Jacobsen, Tjeneren Johan
Lauritz Olsen - Sportsmanden
Julie Henriksen
Svend Cathala
Gudrun Bruun Stephensen
Franz Skondrup
Axel Schultz
Otto Detlefsen
Lau Lauritzen Sr.
Axel Boesen

References

External links
Danish Film Institute

1911 films
Danish silent films
Danish black-and-white films
Films directed by August Blom